Planktotalea lamellibrachiae is a Gram-negative, aerobic, non-spore-forming and rod-shaped bacterium from the genus of Planktotalea which has been isolated from a tubeworm from Kagoshima Bay in Japan.

References 

Rhodobacteraceae
Bacteria described in 2017